Uiryeong County is a county in South Gyeongsang Province, South Korea.

Uiryeong County has a population of 27,550 (2019) and is one of the least populated counties in South Korea.

History

Early history
No presence of Neolithic artefacts have been confirmed, however Bronze Age artefacts such as tombstones have been found in the region.  The region is thought to have been in the domain of Aragaya (modern day Haman County) and the Bisabeol (modern day Changnyeong County) region, during the Three Kingdoms period in Korea, and is thought to have been under the influence of the Kingdom of Silla, after the province of Haju (下州, 하주) was installed in the region of Changnyeong in 555 (under King Jinheung of Silla). The region was also known as Jangham prefecture (獐含縣, 장함현) under Silla, but the prefecture's name was changed to Uiryeong in 757 (under King Gyeongdeok of Silla), and became kind of a subprefecture under Haman prefecture. The Sinban (新反, 신반) region, then also known as Sinui prefecture (辛尒縣, 신이현), Juo township (朱烏村, 주오촌, directly translated as "town of the red raven") or Cheoncheon prefecture (泉川縣, 천천현, directly translated as the "prefecture of the spring streams"), became the subprefecture in the domains of Gangyang County (江陽郡,강양군, modern day Hapcheon County) with the new name "Uisang prefecture" (宜桑縣, 의상현).  In 1018 (under the Goryeo Dynasty), Uiryeong came under the domain of Jinjumok (晋州牧) and a high official called Gammu was appointed in the region.

Modern history

Notable people
In 1938, Lee Byung-chull, a resident of Uiryeong, founded Samsung in the nearby city of Daegu.

On the evening of 26 April 1982, policeman Woo Bum-kon went on a shooting and bombing rampage through several villages in Uiryeong County, killing 56 people and wounding 35 others in the worst non-terrorist spree killing in history.

Climate

Transportation
Uiryeong has a convenient location as it sits between Jinju to the west and Haman/Masan/Changwon to the East. A bus runs regularly from the bus terminal in Uiryeong-Eup to all major cities in South Korea. A bus journey to Masan or Jinju takes approximately 35 minutes and 45 minutes respectively from Uiryeong bus terminal, while the journey to Busan takes 1 hour. It is also possible to take a bus directly to Seoul from Uiryeong.

The biggest problem in terms of transportation is that the intercity buses stop running to Uiryeong from the nearby cities fairly early in the evening. The last bus from Busan is 6:40 PM, from Jinju, it's 7:30 PM and from Masan, it's 9:00 PM.

Sister cities
Uiryeong is twinned with:

  Sacheon, South Korea  
  Muan, South Korea  
  Yongsan-gu, South Korea
  Uiseong, South Korea
  Liaocheng, China
  Mandal, Mongolia

See also
 Yeongnam
 Administrative divisions of South Korea
 Geography of South Korea

References

External links
County government website (in English)
County government website (in Korean)

 
Counties of South Gyeongsang Province